Zoe Viccaji (born 1983) is a Pakistani singer-songwriter and  actress from Karachi. She began her career as a backing vocalist at Coke Studio and later moved on to becoming one of the featured artists. Viccaji has released one studio album which received various accolades.

Early life 
Zoe Viccaji was born in Kharian, Punjab, Pakistan, to Adi Viccaji and Lynettee Viccaji, a Parsi father and Christian mother. She was raised in Karachi, Pakistan. According to Zoe, she has been playing guitar and writing her own songs since the age of fifteen. Singer Rachel Viccaji is her younger sister.

Personal life

Viccaji got married on December 23, 2018, to producer and director Kamal Khan  in Karachi, Pakistan. Her sister, Rachel Viccaji and fellow Coke Studio backup singer and actress Sanam Saeed, were among the bridesmaids in the traditional white wedding. The couple had another event the next day on the traditional Pakistani side of things.

Career 
Zoe started her career at the age of seventeen by joining a local band named Ganda Bandas. A few years later she moved to the United States where she studied in Hamilton College, New York. She also worked in the stage musicals Mamma Mia! and Chicago, both alongside Sanam Saeed. After returning to Pakistan, she released her debut single "Thinking About You" in 2009. She joined Coke Studio in 2010 and collaborated with Strings and Bilal Khan and released the singles "Mera Bichra Yaar" and "Anjane" featuring Strings and Bilal Khan. "Mera Bichra Yaar" was nominated at the 11th Lux Style Awards for Song of the Year.

Zoe released her debut album Dareeche in September 2014 under Universal Music India. In 2015, it won the Best Mixed Album award at the Indian Recording Arts (IRA) in India and Lux Style Award for Best Album in Pakistan. The album spawned a single “Phir Mili Tanhai”. Zoe stated in an interview that “Phir Mili Tanhai” was one of the first songs she wrote and was inspired by her real relationship. "Phir Mili Tanhai was one of the very first songs I wrote. In fact it’s a marker of the period when I turned to songwriting in the first place. I was going through my first major breakup with someone who I had been with for a very long time."

In 2013, Zoe made a cameo appearance in the film Good Morning Karachi as Salon Bride.

Awards & Nominations 

|-
| style="text-align:center;"|2012
| rowspan="1" style="text-align:center;"|"Mera Bichra Yaar"
| 11th Lux Style Award of Song of the Year
|
|-
| style="text-align:center;"|2013
| rowspan="1" style="text-align:center;"|"Hain Yeh Silsilay"
| 12th Lux Style Award for Best Original Soundtrack
|
|-
| style="text-align:center;"|2014
| rowspan="1" style="text-align:center;"|"Jab Koi"
| ARY Film Award for Best Female Playback Singer
|
|-
| style="text-align:center;"|2014
| rowspan="1" style="text-align:center;"|Zoe Viccaji
| 4th Pakistan Media Award for Best Singer (Female)
|
|-
| style="text-align:center;"|2015
| rowspan="1" style="text-align:center;"|Dareeche
| Best Mixed Album Award at IRA
|
|-
| style="text-align:center;"|2015
| rowspan="1" style="text-align:center;"|Dareeche
| 14th Lux Style Award for Best Album
|

Filmography

Discography

Albums

Singles 
 "Tanhaiyan"
 "Jhoom"
 "Ho Jao Aazad"
 "Ruk Tau Zara"
 "Hum Har Qadam Aagay Hon" (All Stars Grand Finale Song)
 "The Time Has Come"
 "Josh"
 "Yeh Dil Kiyun Mera"
 "Jis Nay Bhi Aana Hai, Aik Din Jaana Hai"
 "Thinking About You"
 "Alvida (Feat. Zohaib)"
 "Bichra Yaar (Feat. Strings)"
 "Bolo (Feat. Zohaib)"
 "Breathe in Breathe Out"
 "Jab Koi"
 "Jo Chaho"
 "Kaisay Yeh Hua"
 "Street Signs (Feat. Aamir Zaki and Maaz)"
 "Vamp (Feat. Omar Farooq)"
 "Weave a Sweet Dream"
 "Ishq Kinara (Feat. Sumru Agiryuruyen)"
 "Baray Pyar Se Samjhaen"
 "Ashiqi Angar (Irfan Ali Taj Feat. Zoe Viccaji)"

Coke Studio 
 Senraan Ra Baairya - Asif Hussain Samraat Ft. Zoe Viccaji
 Jaana
 Raat Gaey
 Ishq Kinara  (Zoe Viccaji & Sumru Agiryuriyen)

References

External links 

Living people
Pakistani pop singers
Pakistani women singers
Parsi people
Pakistani Zoroastrians
1983 births